Hermonassa is a genus of moths of the family Noctuidae.

Species
Hermonassa anthracina Boursin, 1967
Hermonassa arenosa (Butler, 1881)
Hermonassa callista Boursin, 1968
Hermonassa cecilia Butler, 1878
Hermonassa chagyabensis Chen, 1983
Hermonassa chersotidia Boursin, 1968
Hermonassa chlora Boursin, 1967
Hermonassa chryserythra Boursin, 1968
Hermonassa clava (Leech, 1900)
Hermonassa consignata Walker, 1865
Hermonassa cyanerythra Boursin, 1968
Hermonassa cyanolepis Boursin, 1967
Hermonassa diaphana Boursin, 1967
Hermonassa diaphthorea Boursin, 1967
Hermonassa dichroma Boursin, 1967
Hermonassa dictyodes Boursin, 1967
Hermonassa dictyota Boursin, 1967
Hermonassa difficilis (Erschoff, 1877)
Hermonassa dispila Boursin, 1967
Hermonassa ellenae Boursin, 1967
Hermonassa emodicola Boursin, 1967
Hermonassa finitima Warren, 1909
Hermonassa formontana Hreblay & Ronkay, 1997
Hermonassa furva Warren, 1912
Hermonassa griseosignata Chen, 1983
Hermonassa hoenei Boursin, 1967
Hermonassa hypoleuca Boursin, 1957
Hermonassa incisa Moore, 1882
Hermonassa inconstans Wileman, 1912
Hermonassa lama Boursin, 1967
Hermonassa lanceola (Moore, 1867)
Hermonassa lineata Warren, 1912
Hermonassa macrotheca Boursin, 1968
Hermonassa marsypiophora Boursin, 1967
Hermonassa megaspila Boursin, 1967
Hermonassa oleographa Hampson, 1911
Hermonassa orbicularis Boursin, 1967
Hermonassa orphnina Boursin, 1967
Hermonassa oxyspila Boursin, 1968
Hermonassa pallidula (Leech, 1900)
Hermonassa phenax Boursin, 1968
Hermonassa psilodora Boursin, 1968
Hermonassa pygmaea Boursin, 1967
Hermonassa reticulata Boursin, 1967
Hermonassa roesleri Boursin, 1967
Hermonassa rufa Boursin, 1968
Hermonassa sinuata Moore, 1881
Hermonassa spilota (Moore, 1867)
Hermonassa stigmatica Warren, 1912
Hermonassa tamsi Boursin, 1968
Hermonassa xanthochlora Boursin, 1967

References

Noctuinae